Cyril Ellis (23 February 1904 – 29 March 1973) was a British athlete who competed at the 1924 Summer Olympics and the 1928 Summer Olympics.

References

External links
 

1904 births
1973 deaths
Sportspeople from Mansfield
Athletes (track and field) at the 1924 Summer Olympics
Athletes (track and field) at the 1928 Summer Olympics
British middle-distance runners
Olympic athletes of Great Britain